The 2014 BYU Cougars baseball team represented Brigham Young University in the 2014 NCAA Division I baseball season.  Mike Littlewood acted in his 2nd season as head coach of the Cougars.  The Cougars came off a season where they exceeded expectations. After being picked to finish sixth, the Cougars finished in a 3-way tie for second and eliminated regular season champion Gonzaga in the WCC tournament. The Cougars would finish 32–21.

For 2014 the Cougars were picked to finish sixth in the WCC 2014 Pre-season rankings. The Cougars played most of their home games at Larry H. Miller Field. However Bruce Hurst Field hosted one BYU home one series in late February, early March, and Brent Brown Ballpark hosted one BYU game.  This was the second consecutive year the Cougars used Bruce Hurst Field for one series due weather concerns. The Cougars ended the season 22–31, 12–15 in conference play, and finished 7th in the WCC Standings.

2014 Roster

Schedule 

! style="background:#FFFFFF;color:#002654;"| Regular Season
|- 

|- align="center" bgcolor="ffbbb"
| February 14 || vs. Kansas || – || Peoria Sports Complex  || 4–10 || Wes Benjamin (1–0) || Chris Howard (0–1) || None || 273 || 0–1 || –
|- align="center" bgcolor="ffbbb"
| February 15 || vs. Kansas || – || Peoria Sports Complex  || 0–2 || Robert Kahana (1–0) || Kolton Mahoney (0–1) || Jordan Piche' (1) || 267 || 0–2 || –
|- align="center" bgcolor="ffbbb"
| February 15 || vs. Kansas || – || Peoria Sports Complex  || 10–11 (10) || Dakota Smith (1–0) || James Lengal (0–1) || None || 281 || 0–3 || –
|- align="center" bgcolor="ffbbb"
| February 17 || vs. Kansas || – || Peoria Sports Complex  || 1–10 || Drew Morovick (1–0) || Jeff Barker (0–1) || Jordan Piche' (2) || 277 || 0–4 || –
|- bgcolor="#ccffcc"
| February 20 || at Texas A&M-Corpus Christi || – || Whataburger Field  || 10–2 || Desmond Poulson (1–0) || Gavin Williamson (0–1) || None || N/A || 1–4 || –
|- align="center" bgcolor="ffbbb"
| February 20 || at Texas A&M-Corpus Christi || – || Whataburger Field  || 1–3 || Matt Danton (1–1) || Hayden Rogers (0–1) || Kaleb Keith (1) || 2,043 || 1–5 || –
|- align="center" bgcolor="ffbbb"
| February 21 || vs. #19 TCU || – || Whataburger Field  || 0–10 || Brandon Finnegan (2–0) || Kolton Mahoney (0–2) || None || N/A || 1–6 || –
|- align="center" bgcolor="ffbbb"
| February 22 || vs. UTSA || – || Whataburger Field  || 1–7 || Nolan Trabanino (2–0) || Jeff Barker (0–2) || None || N/A || 1–7 || –
|- align="center" bgcolor="ffbbb"
| February 24 || at #26 Texas Tech || – || Dan Law Field at Rip Griffin Park || 2–4 || Dylan Dusek (1–0) || Michael Springer (0–1) || Ryan Moseley (1) || 1,863 || 1–8 || –
|- bgcolor="#ccffcc"
| February 27 || Seattle || – || Bruce Hurst Field  || 7–3 || Desmond Poulson (2–0) || Connor Moore (1–1) || None || 307 || 2–8 || –
|- bgcolor="#ccffcc"
| February 28 || Seattle || – || Bruce Hurst Field  || 8–2 || Kolton Mahoney (1–2) || Andrew Olson (0–3) || None || N/A || 3–8 || –
|- bgcolor="#ccffcc"
| February 28 || Seattle || – || Bruce Hurst Field  || 4–2  || Jeff Barker (1–2)  || Mac Acker (2–1) || Brandon Kinser (1) || 403 || 4–8 || –
|-

|- bgcolor="#ccffcc"
| March 4 || Utah || – || Larry H. Miller Field || 20–3 || Desmond Poulson (3–0) || Tanner Banks (1–2) || None || 1,904 || 5–8 || –
|- bgcolor="#ccffcc"
| March 6 || at Nicholls State || – || Ray E. Didier Field || 5–0 || Kolton Mahoney (2–2) || Brandon Jackson (1–1) || None || 157 || 6–8 || –
|- bgcolor="#ccffcc"
| March 7 || at Nicholls State || – || Ray E. Didier Field || 7–6 (12) || Brandon Kinser (1–0) || Marc Picciola (0–2) || None || 221 || 7–8 || –
|- align="center" bgcolor="ffbbb"
| March 7 || at Nicholls State || – || Ray E. Didier Field || 2–10 || Taylor Byrd (2–1) || Chunner Nyberg (0–1) || None || 227 || 7–9 || –
|- align="center" bgcolor="ffbbb"
| March 8 || at Nicholls State || – || Ray E. Didier Field || 1–6 || Grant Borne (2–1) || Desmond Poulson (3–1) || None || 421 || 7–10 || –
|- align="center" bgcolor="ffbbb"
| March 10 || at Dallas Baptist || – || Joan and Andy Horner Ballpark || 3–8 || Cory Taylor (1–0) || Brandon Kinser (1–1) || None || 624 || 7–11 || –
|- align="center" bgcolor="ffbbb"
| March 13 || San Diego* || – || Larry H. Miller Field || 7–14 || PJ Conlon (3–0) || Desmond Poulson (3–2) || None || 844 || 7–12 || 0–1 
|- align="center" bgcolor="ffbbb"
| March 14 || San Diego* || – || Larry H. Miller Field || 1–5 || Troy Conyers (3–0) || Jeff Barker (1–3 || Lucas Long (1) || 1,139 || 7–13 || 0–2
|- align="center" bgcolor="ffbbb"
| March 15 || San Diego* || – || Larry H. Miller Field || 8–17 || Louie Lechich (4–1) || Kolton Mahoney (2–3) || None || 1,173 || 7–14 || 0–3 
|- align="center" bgcolor="ffbbb"
| March 19 || at Fresno State || – || Pete Beiden Field || 1–2 || Jake Shull (1–1) || Michael Springer (0–2) || Jordan Brink (1) || 1,243 || 7–15 || –
|- align="center" bgcolor="ffbbb"
| March 20 || at San Francisco* || – || Dante Benedetti Diamond at Max Ulrich Field || 7–8 || Houston Hibberd (3–0) || Brandon Kinser (1–2) || None || 72 || 7–16 || 0–4
|- bgcolor="#ccffcc"
| March 21 || at San Francisco* || – || Dante Benedetti Diamond at Max Ulrich Field || 7–5 || Jeff Barker (2–3) || Christian Cecilio (2–4) || Kolton Mahoney (1) || 150 || 8–16 || 1–4
|- align="center" bgcolor="ffbbb"
| March 22 || at San Francisco* || – || AT&T Park || 2–5 || Grant Goodman (2–2) || Kolton Mahoney (2–4) || Houston Hibberd (3) || 200 || 8–17 || 1–5
|- bgcolor="#ccffcc"
| March 25 || at Utah || – || Smith's Ballpark || 4–3 || Brandon Kinser (2–2) || Nick Green (0–1) || None || 2,249 || 9–17 || –
|- align="center" bgcolor="ffbbb"
| March 27 || at Saint Mary's* || – || Louis Guisto Field || 3–10 || Ryan Brockett (4–2) || Desmond Poulson (3–3) || None || 91 || 9–18 || 1–6
|- bgcolor="#ccffcc"
| March 28 || at Saint Mary's* || – || Louis Guisto Field || 4–3 || Kolton Mahoney (3–4) || Brad Nease (1–1) || Brandon Kinser (2) || 116 || 10–18 || 2–6
|- align="center" bgcolor="ffbbb"
| March 28 || at Saint Mary's* || – || Louis Guisto Field || 1–6 || Cameron Neff (5–2) || Jeff Barker (2–4) || None || 116 || 10–19 || 2–7
|-

|- align="center" bgcolor="ffbbb"
|April 1 || Utah Valley || – || Larry H. Miller Field || 3–8 || Devin Nelson (2–4) || Michael Springer (0–3) || None || 783 || 10–20 || –
|- bgcolor="#ccffcc"
|April 3 || Pacific* || – || Larry H. Miller Field || 10–1 || Desmond Poulson (4–3) || Michael Benson (0–4) || None || 395 || 11–20 || 3–7
|- bgcolor="#ccffcc"
|April 4 || Pacific* || – || Larry H. Miller Field || 9–3 || Kolton Mahoney (4–4) || Mike Hager (2–4) || None || 931 || 12–20 || 4–7
|- align="center" bgcolor="ffbbb"
|April 5 || Pacific* || – || Brent Brown Ballpark || 7–11 || Jake Jenkins (3–2) || Jeff Barker (2–5) || None || 350 || 12–21 || 4–8
|- bgcolor="#ccffcc"
|April 8 || at Washington State || – || Gesa Stadium || 3–0 || Hayden Rogers (1–1) || Sam Triece (1–2) || Brandon Kinser (3) || 3,360 || 13–21 || –
|- bgcolor="#ccffcc"
| April 10 || at #24 Pepperdine* || – || Eddy D. Field Stadium || 1–0 || Brandon Kinser (3–2) || Corey Miller (6–2) || None || 345 || 14–21 || 5–8
|- align="center" bgcolor="ffbbb"
| April 11 || at #24 Pepperdine* || – || Eddy D. Field Stadium || 4–6 || Matt Maurer (4–1) || Kolton Mahoney (4–5) || Eric Karch (10) || 297 || 14–22 || 5–9
|- align="center" bgcolor="ffbbb"
| April 12 || at #24 Pepperdine* || – || Eddy D. Field Stadium || 1–9 || Aaron Brown (7–1) || Desmond Poulson (4–4) || None || 502 || 14–23 || 5–10
|- align="center" bgcolor="ffbbb"
| April 14 || at #14 UC Santa Barbara || – || Caesar Uyesaka Stadium || 5–9 || Andrew Vasquez (1–0) || Hayden Rogers (1–2) || None || 290 || 14–24 || –
|- align="center" bgcolor="ffbbb"
| April 17 || Loyola Marymount* || – || Larry H. Miller Field || 0–2 || Colin Welmon (6–2) || Desmond Poulson (4–5) || None || 857 || 14–25 || 5–11
|- bgcolor="#ccffcc"
| April 18 || Loyola Marymount* || – || Larry H. Miller Field || 6–2 || Jeff Barker (3–5) || Sean Buckle (1–4) || None  || 1,531 || 15–25 || 6–11
|- bgcolor="#ccffcc"
| April 19 || Loyola Marymount* || – || Larry H. Miller Field || 4–2  || Kolton Mahoney (5–5) || J.D. Busfield (0–1) || Brandon Kinser (4) || 1,668 || 16–25 || 7–11
|- bgcolor="#ccffcc"
| April 29 || at Utah Valley || – || Brent Brown Ballpark || 6–4 || Hayden Rogers (2–2) || Devin Nelson (3–5) || Brandon Kinser (5) || 4,122 || 17–25 || –
|-

|- bgcolor="#ccffcc"
| May 1 || Gonzaga*  || – || Larry H. Miller Field || 11–4 || Jeff Barker (4–5) || Kenny Smith (1–5) || Hayden Rogers (1) || 989 || 18–25 || 8–11
|- align="center" bgcolor="ffbbb"
| May 2 || Gonzaga*  || – || Larry H. Miller Field || 3–4 || Brandon Bailey (5–5) || Chris Howard (0–2) || Karl Myers (4) || 1,290 || 18–26 || 8–12
|- align="center" bgcolor="ffbbb"
| May 3 || Gonzaga*  || – || Larry H. Miller Field || 4–6 || Will Abram (3–1) || Hayden Rogers (2–3) || None || 1,139 || 18–27 || 8–13
|- align="center" bgcolor="ffbbb"
| May 6 || Utah  || – || Larry H. Miller Field || 10–12 || Josh Chapman (3–0) || Brandon Kinser (0–3) || None || 1,065 || 18–28 || –
|- align="center" bgcolor="ffbbb"
| May 8 || Santa Clara*  || – || Larry H. Miller Field || 6–8 || Jason Seever (2–2) || Chris Howard (0–3) || Reece Karalus (11) || 721 || 18–29 || 8–14
|- bgcolor="#ccffcc"
| May 9 || Santa Clara*  || – || Larry H. Miller Field || 16–2 || Jeff Barker (6–5) || Peter Hendron (6–4) || None || 1,112 || 19–29 || 9–14
|- align="center" bgcolor="ffbbb"
| May 10 || Santa Clara*  || – || Larry H. Miller Field || 1–5 || Jacob Steffens (2–4) || Kolton Mahoney (5–6) || None || 1,169 || 19–30 || 9–15
|- align="center" bgcolor="ffbbb"
| May 13 || at Utah || – || Smith's Ballpark || 4–5 || Josh Chapman (4–0) || Hayden Rogers (2–4) || None || 3,800 || 19–31 || –
|- bgcolor="#ccffcc"
| May 15 || at Portland* || – || Joe Etzel Field || 11–1 || Jeff Barker (6–5) || Colin Feldtman (2–8)  || None || 333 || 20–31 || 10–15
|- bgcolor="#ccffcc"
| May 16 || at Portland* || – || Joe Etzel Field || 6–3 || Kolton Mahoney (6–6) || Jackson Lockwood (3–3)  || Brandon Kinser (6) || 343 || 21–31 || 11–15
|- bgcolor="#ccffcc"
| May 17 || at Portland* || – || Joe Etzel Field || 6–1 || Desmond Poulson (5–5) || Chad Kjemhus (1–4) || None || 373 || 22–31 || 12–15
|-

|-
| style="font-size:88%" | Rankings from Collegiate Baseball. Parenthesis indicate tournament seedings.
|-
| style="font-size:88%" | *West Coast Conference games

TV & Radio Information
All home and conference games as well as select non-conference road games (at Utah and at UC Santa Barbara) were broadcast on KOVO with Brent Norton (play-by-play) calling the games for his 25th consecutive season. A rotating selection of analysts will be used. Most of the games were simulcast on BYU Radio.

BYUtv broadcast 9 home games:  Mar. 13 & 15 vs. San Diego, Apr. 3 vs. Pacific, Apr. 17 vs. Loyola Marymount, May 1–3 vs. Gonzaga, and May 8 & 10 vs. Santa Clara. Sister station KBYU aired the May 6 home game vs. Utah. BYUtv/KBYU used Spencer Linton and Dave McCann as their play-by-play men. Gary Sheide returned as the analyst. An additional six games aired on the WCC's online station- TheW.tv: Mar. 4 vs. Utah, Mar. 14 vs. San Diego, Apr. 1 vs. Utah Valley, Apr. 18 vs. Loyola Marymount, May 9 vs. Santa Clara, and May 16 at Portland. TheW.tv games were the conference's first non-basketball broadcasts outside the state of California and the first game featuring a non-conference opponent in baseball. Both games at Utah, Mar. 25 & May 13, aired on Pac-12 Network (the Mar. 25 game being a Pac-12 Mountain exclusive), the game at Utah Valley, Apr. 29,  aired on UVU's YouTube channel, the 3-game series at Pepperdine will air on TV-32 Malibu and be simulcast online by WavesCast, and the game at Fresno State aired on the Mountain West Network powered by Campus Insiders. Had the Cougars returned to the WCC baseball tournament, the games would have aired on TheW.tv.

2014 MLB Draft
Two BYU Cougar players were selected in the 2014 MLB Draft. Both have the option of coming back to BYU should they not sign a contract. Sophomore Pitcher Kolton Mahoney, who just completed his second full year at BYU after serving a church mission to Santa Rosa, California from 2012–13, was selected in the 23rd Round, 686th overall pick, by the Milwaukee Brewers. Shortstop Tanner Chauncey, who was serving a church mission in the Brazil João Pessoa Mission from 2013–14 and would be back for the 2015 season as a sophomore, was selected in the 35th Round, 1,059th overall pick, by the Los Angeles Dodgers.

References 

BYU
BYU Cougars baseball seasons
BYU Cougars baseball